Wilfrid V. Worland (1907–1999) was an architect who between the 1930s and the 1990s shaped the suburban landscape of Washington, D.C., by specializing in town houses and who designed two developments named for him --"Worland", a five-story apartment building on Wisconsin Avenue in Washington, D.C., and a town house cluster also called "Worland" on Democracy Boulevard in Bethesda, Md. The 41-unit Wisconsin Avenue project is the only Washington apartment house named for its architect, considered one of Washington's most distinguished addresses.

Career

Among the thousands of brick colonial and federal-style homes he designed since the 1930s were parts of Woodacres and the entire neighborhoods of Fallsreach, Falls Mead, Luxmanor, Old Farm and Westbard Mews in Maryland. He also designed the neighborhoods of Lake Ridge, Falcon Ridge, Carlyle Walk and Afton Glen, all in Virginia.

Among the nonresidential structures Worland helped design was Our Lady of Lourdes Catholic Church in Bethesda, Md.

In the late 1940s, Worland formed a partnership with architect Michael A. Patterson.  The firm, Patterson & Worland, created the designs for many of the homes in Montgomery Village (1967), a planned community designed by the Kettler Brothers. Patterson & Worland, became Worland Associates after Patterson retired in 1978. Worland retired in 1992, and the Rockville-based concern became Hutchinson + Associates.

Explaining the appeal of the colonial style in 1980, Worland told The Washington Post, "Many people move here from someplace else. They feel that they need something with a background. The brick colonial is sort of a blanket–it provides security, a feeling of having been established in a community. And it holds its value."

Bob Mitchell, president of the National Association of Home Builders, led a firm that built many of the projects Worland designed. Mitchell said: "Everything he did, particularly his exteriors, were just perfectly in balance." Peerless Rockville Historic Preservation Ltd. gave a Preservation Award in 1985 to Mitchell & Best Co. for a group of five wood-and-brick, condominium-style buildings Worland designed. The structures are called Rockmanor Office Park, at 1686 E. Gude Dr., Rockville, Md., and feature rear balconies overlooking Redgate Municipal Golf Course.

Worland was born in Jasper, Indiana, and was a 1931 architecture graduate of what was then the Carnegie Institute of Technology in Pittsburgh, Pennsylvania. After graduation, he came to the Washington area and began work as an architect.

During World War II, he served in the Corps of Engineers, receiving a Bronze Star and the Legion of Merit. He retired from the Army Reserve as a colonel in 1967.

Worland was a member of the American Institute of Architects and Holy Cross Catholic Church in Garrett Park, Md. His hobbies included gardening and family history.

Worland died December 11, 1999, at his home in Bethesda, Md., of a heart attack. Survivors included his wife of 65 years, Mary Rose Pauly Worland in Bethesda (originally from Falls Church, Virginia); two daughters, Kathleen Hamm, in Bethesda, and Paula Lipsitz, in Tucson; two sons, Julien, in St. Louis, and Wilfrid, in British Columbia; his youngest brother, Donovan, in San Francisco; and 11 grandchildren.

Worland was a co-author (with Olive Lewis Kolb and Vincent Worland) of One Man's Family: The Genealogy of the Worland Family in America, 1662–1962 published privately in 1968 and available as a PDF. He was the posthumous author of Jasper Remembered: An Oral History of the Early 1900s in Southern Indiana, published in 2010, which is available from the Dubois Co. Historical Museum, Jasper, Ind.

References

Sources
 Bernstein, Adam. "Architect Wilfrid Worland Dies at 92." The Washington Post, Tuesday, December 14, 1999, Page B07.
 Goode, James M. Best Addresses: A Century of Washington's Distinguished Apartment Houses. Smithsonian Institution Press, Washington, D.C., 1988.

1907 births
1999 deaths
Recipients of the Legion of Merit
People from Jasper, Indiana
20th-century American architects